The Cornell 100+ MPG Team (Formerly Cornell AXP) was the first officially registered university team competing in the Progressive Insurance Automotive X Prize Competition. The group was made up of over 70 undergraduate and graduate students from six of Cornell University’s seven colleges including the College of Engineering, the College of Architecture, Art, and Planning, the College of Human Ecology, and the Johnson Graduate School of Management.

The multi-disciplinary group was organized into several teams, including Electrical Components, Mechanical Components, Structures, Business Administration, Design, and Information Management. These groups utilized a systems engineering approach to design an automobile that would push the limits of efficiency, feature a distinctive and unique aesthetic, and be commercially viable in the market.

The goal of the team was to win the competition and to provide the world with a state-of-the-art automobile that would help reduce global non-renewable power consumption and harmful emissions. However, after successfully completing the first stages of the shakedown in May, the vehicle experienced multiple electronics failures during the endurance portion.  The team decided to withdraw from the competition for safety reasons, since they did not have the time and resources to fully diagnose the problem.

Testing

The Cornell 100+ MPG Team tested and evaluated different component technologies and systems in preparation of the final submission to the Progressive Insurance Automotive X Prize Competition. The team used a 1991 Geo Metro as a test bed to evaluate the efficiency and feasibility of components including drivetrains, battery packs, electrical generators, and regenerative braking schemes.

In addition, the team's aerodynamics and design specialists created and tested conceptual design schemes both in computer simulation software and in real-world wind tunnels. The team's plan was to arrive at a final design, which was to take the form of a feasibly marketable vehicle that could be brought to market in the near term.

Technology

The team's final submission car was to be a plug-in hybrid electric vehicle (PHEV). This technology would allow the car to act as a pure electric vehicle for a range of 40–50 miles on a full battery charge. When this battery power runs low, the car would be capable of recharging while in motion, using a small gasoline-powered onboard generator. The vehicle would also be capable of recharging, while stationary, from an outlet connected to the electricity grid.

The final entry was a series diesel hybrid, a car that would only use the power from the electric motor for propulsion. The combustion engine, a 1.4L Volkswagen motor, would only be used to generate power and recharge the batteries, which would then give power to the electric motor to drive the car. The vehicle would also feature a very aerodynamic, low drag design.

The Cornell 100+ MPG Team was competing in the mainstream class of the competition, which requires that the final submission be a 4-wheel, 4-passenger design.

Team Structure

The Cornell 100+ MPG Team was made up of over 55 students from many different educational backgrounds, including engineering, architecture, design and environmental analysis, and business. This multi-disciplinary group was organized into several teams, including Electrical Components, Mechanical Components, Structures, Design, Information Management, and Business Administration. The team was restructured for the start of Spring Semester 2009 to include an Engineering Resources sub-team.

Electrical Components Team
The function of the Electrical Components Team was to help choose and develop electric motors, batteries, and power electronics, as well as to create logical and efficient interfaces between them and the engine. Its engineers were challenged to balance the car's performance and the passenger comfort with maximum electrical efficiency.

In order to optimize the electrical efficiency of the vehicle, the team performed extensive research and development on all of the component technologies related to the car's electrical system. These components and systems included battery packs, motors/controllers, regenerative braking systems, engine control units, as well as eco-feedback schemes (MPG and emissions read-outs).

Mechanical Components Team
The function of the Mechanical Components Team was to develop a light and efficient drive train as well as to simulate the dynamic performance of the vehicle. The team was focusing on getting the most efficiency and performance out of several areas, and split into subgroups to maximize its potential to innovate in the following areas: Engine, Transmission, Brakes, Regeneration, and HVAC. For example, the engine team was looking at a variety of engines on the market and evaluating which can be optimized for use in the Progressive Insurance Automotive X Prize competition, as well as exactly how they might be modified to make them even more efficient.

Structures Team
The function of the Structures Team was to engineer the external architecture and components of the vehicle, including the frame, body, and suspension. The team also had to ensure that all dimensions were compliant with motor vehicle laws and that the vehicle achieved an adequate crash test rating.

The team’s main challenge was to maximize aerodynamic efficiency while integrating the mechanical and electrical components that the other teams were designing. For the Chassis Team, coordination with the other Cornell 100+ MPG Team engineers was essential as they worked towards selecting the best frame structure and suspension systems for the vehicle.

Design Team
The function of the Design Team was to perform a critical balancing act, weighing exterior style, aerodynamics, and interior space against the restrictions that the vehicle’s other components might impose. They worked closely with the entire 100+ MPG team, and were responsible for creating conceptual designs of the car that could be tested for safety and aerodynamic properties. They were to select a final concept design, which they would then develop further into a feasibly-marketable vehicle that could be brought to market in the near-term. Other responsibilities included creating and maintaining all visual identities of the team. The Design Team included students from several of Cornell’s colleges, which brought a diverse skill set to all of their important responsibilities.

Information Management Team
The function of the Information Management Team was to provide the rest of the team with efficient systems of communication as well as to provide a portal for the general public to easily learn about the team's efforts. They accomplished these goals using several web-based, cutting edge systems: a TWiki system, an Eventum system, and a SilverStripe system.

The Twiki software provides a central platform for keeping agendas, research, reports, weekly updates, calendars, and other team documents. The Eventum system is used for task-tracking, and enables sub-team leaders to keep track of the tasks assigned to each team member, as well as the status of each of these tasks. Both Eventum and Twiki promote collaboration by maintaining open communications throughout the team organization. The SilverStripe software is a web-based Content Management System (CMS) that is being used to efficiently add and maintain the digital content found on Cornell 100+ MPG's public website.

Business Administration Team
The function of the Business Administration Team was to deal primarily with the sponsorship, publicity, and operational needs of the team. Operational responsibilities included coordinating media relations and involvement in academic on-campus and public events, organizing team lab logistics and events, and recruiting new team members. Pecuniary responsibilities included structuring team budgeting, purchasing, and product acquisition support, establishing new team sponsors, and maintaining relationships with current sponsors. A legacy arm of the sub-team was the Business Plan Team. The Business Plan Team objective was to identify a target market for the final vehicle, intelligently price it, and create a system for producing, distributing, and servicing the vehicle with the goal of bringing to market at least 10,000 units per year. The team was made up of several Johnson Graduate School of Management students who have experience in supply-chain management, consulting, and corporate finance.

Sponsorship

The support of sponsors allowed Cornell students, both undergraduate and graduate, to get hands-on experience building a car that could change the automotive industry, thus enhancing their educational experience at Cornell. Cornell University provided the team with faculty time, laboratory space, and testing facilities. However, the majority of Cornell 100+ MPG's design and production budget came directly from private and corporate donations.

Current Sponsors

Ultimate-102 Level
Sponsors in the Ultimate-102 category contributed at least $25,000.

 General Electric
 Cornell University College of Engineering
 National Instruments
 NYSERDA
 Changs Ascending Enterprise Co., Ltd. (CAEC)

Premium-92 Level
Sponsors in the Premium-92 category donated anywhere from $7,500 to $24,999.

 First Manhattan
 Tektronix, Inc.
 Toyota Motor Corporation
 Optimal Solutions Software
 Amber Composites
 Lockheed Martin
 General Plastics Manufacturing Company
 Formosa Energy & Material Technology Co., Ltd
 Rhine Electronic Co., LTD
 EVO Electric
 YT Stable Tech Corp.

Plus-89 Level
Sponsors in the Plus-89 category contributed from $2,500 to $7,499.

 Autodesk
 Cornell University - Systems Engineering Program
 Popular Mechanics
 The Triad Foundation
 Exide Technologies
 EMCON Technologies
 Milwaukee Electric Tool Corporation
 Penske Corporation & Penske Racing
 The EDN Group
 ConocoPhillips
 Select Euro Cars
 Shell

E-85
Sponsors in the E-85 category contributed less than or equal to $2,500.

 Sunstone Circuits
 Maxxis Tires
 Maval Gear
 Rochester Gear, Inc.
 Champlain Cable Corporation
 Student Agencies, Inc.
 Masterflux
 Eberspächer catem GmbH & Co. KGn
 Pacific Panels, Inc.
 Vested Capital Partners
 Nokian Tyres
 Painless Performance
 Ross-Tech

Friends of the Team
Sponsors who were Friends of the Team made private donations.

 The Robison Family - In honor of Steve Altman
 The Tyrone Family
 Pete Derycke Jr.
 Edmund Cranch
 Sarah (Hsiu-Hui Lee) Cheng '81 and Dr. Cheng

Media Sponsor
 Popular Mechanics

Blog Articles
 May 21, 2008 - Last-Minute Mods Get Cornell’s Auto X Prize Mule in Test Rally for Real-World MPG Clues - "Cornell AXP unleashed the team's mule car on the open road for the first time recently, participating in the 2008 Green Grand Prix in Watkins Glen, N.Y. The 60-mile road rally, now in its fourth year, is a showcase for alternative-energy vehicles and was the team’s first stop en route to the race for the Automotive X Prize..."
 May 15, 2008 - Cornell Auto X Prize Team Hacks Metro Geo Chassis for 100-mpg Hybrid - "Electric power generation may be the most complex and innovative aspect of building a hybrid for the Automotive X Prize, but a solid foundation to support all that battery weight is just as important. As Cornell’s Popular Mechanics-sponsored AXP team integrated electrical components into its Geo Metro mule, the car’s chassis has received a complete overhaul as well..."
 April 7, 2008 - PM-Sponsored Cornell Auto X Prize Squad Builds Mega-Efficient Drivetrain - "With just one semester of school before X Prize qualification rounds begin, a flurry of work by different groups within the Cornell AXP team is progressing here simultaneously. We ordered supplies for transforming our Geo Metro into a plug-in hybrid electric vehicle after our last update, and with much of our hardware in house, we’ve begun work on the mule—and its modified drivetrain..."
 February 21, 2008 - PM's Huge Auto X Prize Team Tests Geo Metro, Set to Buy Off-the-Shelf Plug-In Parts - "In our last update, we announced that the Cornell team had selected a Geo Metro as our mule car for the Automotive X-Prize. Picking the right ride was an important step in developing our plug-in hybrid entry, but over the next semester the real hands-on work gets interesting..."
 November 9, 2007 - PM's Auto X Prize Team Picks Geo Metro to Go Electric at 100 MPG - "After months of planning and analysis, the goals of our Automotive X-Prize team (now more than 70 people strong) are finally taking shape—the shape of a Geo Metro, to be exact. Based on analysis done by our various experts here at Cornell, we decided over the summer to create a mainstream, four-passenger, plug-in hybrid electric vehicle (PHEV)..."
 October 3, 2007 - PM’s Auto X Prize Kids Zip Toward 100 MPG With a Plug-in Car - "It’s been an exciting past few weeks for the Cornell Automotive X-Prize Team. Not only have we gotten a few new team members and a new office, but we’ve chosen the type of alt-energy car we’ll be trying to take 100 miles—and beyond—on a single gallon of fuel..."
 August 19, 2007 - Cornell Students Seek 100-mpg Auto X Prize (and PM Sponsors Them) - "Whether you’ve got a crossover vehicle or a hot rod, one thing’s for certain: You love your car. But dependency on foreign oil and the consequences of global warming have cast a pall on vehicle ownership..."

Notes

External links 

 Cornell 100+ MPG Team - Cornell 100+ MPG Team Official Website
 Automotive X-Prize - Automotive X-Prize Official Website

Cornell University student organizations
Automobile associations in the United States